INS Kozhikode (M71) was a minesweeper of the Karwar class, of similar design to the  ships that were in service with the Indian Navy till 2012. Built by the Sredne-Nevskiy Shipyard at Saint Petersburg, Russia. Except for the addition of surface-to-air missiles. Kozhikode is a modified . The ship took part in the International Fleet Review 2016 that was held off the coast of Visakhapatnam.

The ship was decommissioned from the fleet on 13 April 2019.

References

Pondicherry-class minesweepers
Ships built in the Soviet Union
India–Soviet Union relations
1988 ships
Ships built at Sredne-Nevskiy Shipyard